The Tercio "Duque de Alba" No. 2 of the Legion" is an infantry regiment of the Spanish Legion. It's based in Ceuta and commands the Protected Infantry Bandera "Cristo de Lepanto" IV/2.

Regiments of the Spanish Legion